Ralph Andrew Adams (born July 9, 1907, date of death 1976) was a Canadian athlete who competed in the 1928 Summer Olympics.

He was born in Hamilton, Ontario.

In 1928 he was eliminated in the quarter-finals of the 100 metres event as well as of the 200 metres competition. He was also a member of the Canadian relay team which was disqualified in the final of the 4×100 metres contest.

At the 1930 Empire Games he won the gold medal with the Canadian relay team in the 4×110 yards event. In the 220 yards competition he was eliminated in the heats.

Competition record

External links
Ralph Adams's profile at Sports Reference.com
 

1907 births
Athletes from Hamilton, Ontario
Canadian male sprinters
Olympic track and field athletes of Canada
Athletes (track and field) at the 1928 Summer Olympics
Athletes (track and field) at the 1930 British Empire Games
Commonwealth Games gold medallists for Canada
Commonwealth Games medallists in athletics
1976 deaths
Medallists at the 1930 British Empire Games